René-Nicolas Ehni (29 April 1935 – 18 June 2022) was a French writer and playwright.

Selected publications 
 La Gloire du vaurien, Julliard, 1963 — réédition UGE, coll. « 10/18 », 1974 ; Christian Bourgois, 2000.
 Que ferez-vous en novembre ? (Théâtre I), Christian Bourgois, 1968.
Ensuite, nous fûmes à Palmyre, Gallimard, 1968.
 L'Amie Rose (Théâtre II), Christian Bourgois, 1970.
 Super-positions (Théâtre III), Christian Bourgois, 1970.
 Babylone vous y étiez, nue parmi les bananiers, Christian Bourgois, 1971 — réédition UGE, coll. «10/18», 1973 ;  Christian Bourgois, 2000.
 Eugénie Kroponime, Christian Bourgois, 1972.
 Pintades, Christian Bourgois, 1974 — réédition Christian Bourgois, 2000.
 Jocaste, Christian Bourgois, 1976.
 La Raison lunatique. Roman du pays, coécrit avec Louis Schittly, Gallimard, coll. « Les Presses d'aujourd'hui », 1978.
 Le Mariage de Gudrun, Éditions libres Hallier, 1979.
Côme, confession générale, Christian Bourgois, 1981.
Rahab et les héritiers de la gloire, Strasbourg, BF, 1988.
Vert de Gris, traité autobiographique, Strasbourg, La Nuée bleue, 1994.
Venez, enfants de la patrie !, Strasbourg, La Nuée Bleue, 1998.
Quand nous dansions sur la table ; suivi de Lettre à Dominique, Christian Bourgois, 2000.
 Algérie-roman, Denoël, 2002.
 Chantefable, le Père, la Fille et le Saint-Ballon, Strasbourg, La Nuée bleue, 2006.
 Apnée, autobiographie, Christian Bourgois, 2008.

References

1935 births
2022 deaths
20th-century French writers
21st-century French writers
20th-century French male writers
21st-century French male writers
People from Haut-Rhin